The National People's Party may refer to:

National People's Party (Bangladesh), see List of political parties in Bangladesh
National People's Party (Curaçao)
National People's Party (Czechoslovakia)
National People's Party (Greece), see National Radical Party (Greece)
National People's Party (India)
Rashtriya Janata Dal (National People's Party), party in the state of Bihar, India
Rashtriya Lok Dal (National People's Party), India
National People's Party (Indonesia)
National People's Party (Norway)
National Peoples Party (Pakistan)
National People's Party (Rhodesia), see Rhodesian general election, 1965
National People's Party (Sierra Leone), see Sierra Leonean general election, 1996
National People's Party (South Africa)
National People's Party (South Africa, 1981), which later became the Minority Front
Kuomintang (Taiwan), sometimes translated as National People's Party
National People's Party (The Gambia)
National People's Party (Zimbabwe)

See also
National Popular Party (disambiguation)